The English ship Speaker was a 50-gun third-rate. Speaker was built for the navy of the Commonwealth of England by Christopher Pett at Woolwich Dockyard and launched in 1650. At the Restoration she was renamed HMS Mary.

In 1688, HMS Mary was rebuilt by Thomas Shish at Woolwich Dockyard as a 62-gun third-rate ship of the line. The ship was wrecked on the Goodwin Sands in the Great Storm of 1703. Almost all who were aboard were drowned, including Rear-Admiral Basil Beaumont.

Description and early history

She was built by Christopher Pett, as one of a pair of flagships for the Winter Guard of the navy of the Commonwealth of England. Built at Woolwich Dockyard, she was launched in 1650.

Speakers tonnage was 727 tons burthen. Originally designed to have 44 guns, the armament was increased to 50 guns in October 1649, and 56 guns by 1653. This was increased again to 60 guns between 1655 and 1660.

Speaker participated in the Battle of the Gabbard in 1653, being large enough to serve as the flagship for Rear Admiral Samuel Howett in the Rear division of the Red squadron.

Restoration of Charles II
Speaker was part of the fleet led by Naseby, London, Richard, and Swiftsure who collected Charles II of England from Holland and brought him back from exile. Charles renamed the ship HMS Mary.

Post-Restoration career 
At the Restoration, Speaker was renamed HMS Mary. By 1677 her armament had been increased to 62 guns.

In 1688, Mary was rebuilt by Thomas Shish at Woolwich Dockyard as a 62-gun third-rate ship of the line. Mary was wrecked on the Goodwin Sands in the Great Storm of 1703. Of her 275 crew, her captain and purser were ashore at the time of her loss; only one sailor on board survived. Rear-Admiral Basil Beaumont however was aboard ship at the time and perished in the wreck.

Wreck site
Local divers found the wreck site in 1980. The initial designation was of  around what is now known as the South Mound; the North Mound was discovered in 1999 and the area was amended under Statutory Instrument number 2004/2395 as a  radius around 51° 15.6302' N, 01° 30.0262' E.

It is believed that Mary lies under the South Mound and the North Mound is probably the third rate HMS Restoration that was wrecked in the same storm.

The site was investigated by Wessex Archaeology on 25 June 2006. The South Mound measures  but has not been studied in detail.

Legacy
Mary could be considered as the first example of a ship of the line. Although it was built before the concept of a ship of the line was developed, it some of the characteristics of such a ship.

Notes

References

Sources
 
 
 

Speaker-class ships of the line
Ships of the line of the Royal Navy
1650s ships
Ships built in Woolwich
Maritime incidents in 1703